Apollonio Buonfratelli (16th century) was an Italian miniature painter of the Renaissance, active in Florence.

References

Year of birth missing
Year of death missing
Renaissance painters
16th-century Italian painters
Italian male painters
Painters from Florence